Jawahar Navodaya Vidyalaya, Gajanur (JNVG) is a boarding school near Gajanur, Shimoga, India. JNVG is funded by the Indian Ministry of Human Resources Development.

History
The school was established in the year 1986 in the campus of Gajanur vidyapeeta by the Navodaya Vidyalaya Samiti, an autonomous body which comes under the Ministry of Human Resource and Development New Delhi. Navodaya Vidyalaya is the dream child of late Shri Rajiv Gandhi, the Ex-Prime Minister of India. Later the school shifted to its own  campus in hilly area of Gajanur in 1990.

The founder Principal Shri. H. N. S. Rao Ex. Deputy Commissioner (Academics), NVS, New Delhi had formatted the school in such a way that it continues to be the Jewel of Shimoga district.

Campus
School stands on a  campus near Gajanur village, and also very near to Tunga Dam. Westside of campus has greenery hills. Tunga dam's Left Bank canal will pass in front of campus main gate. The campus has several buildings, the administration Block, main class room buildings, Laboratory building, workshops, Junior Science Lab, Library, teachers' quarters, students' dormitories, principal's house, guest house, Girls' Mess, Boys' Mess, sports ground, Power house, water tank.

Awards and recognition
 Four Students of Class XII Vocational commerce stream, Balamurali Kommunje, Meenakshi Jadhav, Anitha NA & Sahana were felicitated for topping the Class XII Examinations held in AY 1996–97 at Hyderabad
 Received 4th Computer Literacy Excellence Awards for Schools – 2005 from IT Minister Shri A. Raja.
 Received Best Principal Award from Hon.HRD Minister Shri Arjun Singh.
 Shri R. S Suresh Received Intel Technology Award from Shri O.N Singh, Commissioner, NVS, New Delhi.
 Received Intel-Technology Award 2007 from Shri Rath Education secretary, Govt. of India, New Delhi.
 Received E-Excellence Award.
 Received Best Teacher Award from Hon.HRD Minister Shri Arjun Singh.
 Received Best Teacher Award.

Alumni Association

Milana
Alumni association is functioning effectively in the Vidyalaya since 1999 with a view to record the 'Social Values' our family members (Ex-Navodians) have achieved.

First Sunday of December every year the Alumni Meet is conducted in the Vidyalaya.

Houses
Previously there were 7 houses. Preethi, Keerthi, Neethi, Spoorthi, Shakthi, Kanthi and Shanthi.

Now the houses are renamed and it's same for all the JNV's all over India.
Aravali Senior,  Nilgiri Senior,  Shivalik Senior,  Udaygiri Senior,  Aravali Junior,  Nilgiri Junior,  Shivalik Junior, Udaygiri Junior.

Principals
 H.N.S.Rao (1986 - 1991), first principal
 H.S.Chalageri (1991 - 1994)
 Shobha Dove (1994 - 1997)
 P.V.S.Ranga Rao (1997 - 1998)
 A.Y.Reddy (1998 - 1999)
 H.K.B.Goud (1999 - 2001)
 K.B.Gopinath (2001 - 2001)
 S.S.Divakar (2001 - 2003)
 Ravi Perumal (2003 - 2013)
 R. Prem Kumar (2013 - Till Date)

References

External links
 http://www.jnvshimoga.gov.in
 http://www.jnvg.org
 Blogs about the memories of school days
  GoogleMaps

Jawahar Navodaya Vidyalayas in Karnataka
Educational institutions established in 1986
1986 establishments in Karnataka
Boarding schools in Karnataka
Schools in Shimoga district